Knüllwald is a municipality in the Schwalm-Eder district in Hesse, Germany.

Geography

Location
Knüllwald lies in the Knüllgebirge, a low mountain range, between the rivers Efze and Beise, south of Kassel.

Constituent communities
The community consists of sixteen centres: Appenfeld, Berndshausen, Ellingshausen, Hausen, Hergetsfeld, Lichtenhagen, Nausis, Nenterode, Niederbeisheim, Oberbeisheim, Reddingshausen, Remsfeld (administrative seat), Rengshausen, Schellbach, Völkershain and Wallenstein.

History
The formation of the greater community of Knüllwald came about in stages as part of Hesse's municipal reforms.

On 31 December 1971, the communities of Appenfeld, Ellingshausen, Hergetsfeld, Oberbeisheim, Reddingshausen, Remsfeld, Schellbach, Völkershain and Wallenstein voluntarily combined to form the new community of Knüllwald. Likewise, on the same day, the communities of Hausen, Lichtenhagen, Nausis, Nenterode and Rengshausen voluntarily combined to form the new community of Rengshausen.

By state law on 1 January 1974, the communities of Berndshausen, Niederbeisheim and Rengshausen were amalgamated with the already extant greater community of Knüllwald, thereby forming one of Hesse's biggest polycentric communities.

Partner towns
, Dömsöd (Pest county)

References

External links
Knüllwald
Nenterode

Schwalm-Eder-Kreis